Scorzoneroides autumnalis, commonly called autumn hawkbit,  is a perennial plant species, widespread in its native range in Eurasia (from Europe east to western Siberia), and introduced in North America.

The plant is sometimes called fall dandelion, because it is very similar to the common dandelion (one of the main differences being a branched stem with several capitula), but "yellow fields", covered by this plant appear much later than dandelions, towards the autumn in the Eastern Europe. In the Latin synonym of the plant name, Leontodon autumnalis,"leontodon" means "lion's tooth", the same as "dandelion".

Description
Scorzoneroides autumnalis  is a perennial herb growing to 35 cm high usually with branched stems and several flower-heads each about 30 mm across. The florets are all ligulate and bright yellow. The leaves are all basal and linear-oblong.

Reproduction
Flowers in June to October producing achenes.

Habitat
Frequent in damp grassland and meadows.

Ecology
The fly Tephritis leontodontis is known to attack the capitula of this plant.

Distribution
Abundant in Ireland and Great Britain.

References

External links

Cichorieae
Plants described in 1753
Taxa named by Carl Linnaeus